The 2018 Daytona 500, the 60th running of the event, was a Monster Energy NASCAR Cup Series race held on February 18, 2018, contested over 207 laps—extended from 200 laps due to an overtime finish—on the  asphalt superspeedway. It was the first race of the 2018 Monster Energy NASCAR Cup Series season, and also marked the first race for the Chevrolet Camaro ZL1 as Chevrolet's car for this season, replacing the SS. Austin Dillon of Richard Childress Racing won the race after contact with Aric Almirola on the final lap resulted in a single-car accident for the latter. Bubba Wallace making his first Daytona 500 start finished second while Denny Hamlin came in third. This was the last Daytona 500 starts for Danica Patrick, Trevor Bayne, Kasey Kahne, David Gilliland, Mark Thompson (in his only Daytona 500 start), BK Racing, Furniture Row Racing and D. J. Kennington.

Report

Background

Daytona International Speedway is one of six superspeedways to hold NASCAR races, the others being Michigan International Speedway, Auto Club Speedway, Indianapolis Motor Speedway, Pocono Raceway, and Talladega Superspeedway. The track's turns are banked at 31 degrees, while the front stretch, the location of the finish line, is banked at 18 degrees.

Notes
This was the first Daytona 500 race since 1982 where none of the cars were sponsored by beer companies (Kevin Harvick and Brad Keselowski, sponsored by Anheuser-Busch InBev and MillerCoors, respectively, were instead sponsored by Jimmy John's and Discount Tire for the race). Only 40 cars entered the race, meaning no entrants would fail to qualify for the race.

Entry list

 (R) Denotes Rookie of the Year candidate.
 (i) Denotes driver has declared for another NASCAR national touring series championship and is thus ineligible for Monster Energy NASCAR Cup Series championship points.
 (W) denotes past winner of the 500.

Practice

First practice (February 10)

Second practice (February 10)

Qualifying

Qualifying results

Can-Am Duels

The Can-Am Duels are a pair of NASCAR Sprint Cup Series races held in conjunction with the Daytona 500 annually in February at Daytona International Speedway. They consist of two races 60 laps and 150 miles (240 km) in length, which serve as heat races that set the lineup for the Daytona 500. The first race sets the lineup for cars that qualified in odd-numbered positions on pole qualifying day, while the second race sets the lineup for cars that qualified in even-numbered positions. The Duels set the lineup for positions 3–38, while positions 39 and 40 are filled by the two "Open" (teams without a charter) cars that set the fastest times in qualifying, but did not lock in a spot in the Duels.

For championship purposes, each Duel is a full Championship Stage, except there is no playoff point awarded.  The top ten drivers receive championship points.

Duel 1

Duel 1 results

Duel 2

Duel 2 results

Starting lineup

Practice (post–Duels)

Third practice (February 16)

Fourth practice (February 16)

Final practice (February 17)

Race

Stage 1

Start 

The 60th running of the Daytona 500 began with Alex Bowman leading the field to the green flag. Denny Hamlin took the lead on lap 1 and led the first 10 laps. The first caution of the race came out on lap 9 when Corey LaJoie blew an engine in Turn 2, and Hamlin was penalized one lap for pitting outside his box prior to the caution.

Racing resumed on lap 13. Kyle Busch's tire went flat on lap 30 and had to pit, dropping him from 5th to 38th to get his tire fixed. The second caution came out on lap 52 for a three-car wreck in turn 3. Kyle Busch spun out prior to the same time his tire went flat. The first ten cars did not opt to pit, waiting instead for the end of the first 60-lap stage, the second points-paying stage of the year (the Duels count as a championship points stage, but not a playoff points stage).

The race went back to green on lap 56, with five laps remaining in the first stage. On Lap 60, the final lap of the stage, a major pileup occurred on the end of the backstretch, bringing out the third caution flag of the race. The crash was triggered when Ricky Stenhouse Jr. attempted to block Ryan Blaney battling for second. Stenhouse briefly lost control of his car before saving it, but the resulting slowdown led to Erik Jones spinning in front of the field and starting the wreck. As the stage ended under caution 2017 Daytona 500 champion and leader Kurt Busch won the stage. A total of nine cars was involved in the melee, including William Byron, Erik Jones, Ty Dillon, Daniel Suárez, Jimmie Johnson, Ricky Stenhouse Jr., Ryan Blaney, Martin Truex Jr., and Kyle Larson. A total of four cars were out of the race, including Jimmie Johnson, Daniel Suárez, Erik Jones, and Ty Dillon.

Stage 2 
Stage 1 winner Kurt Busch was penalized for missing his pit box on the ensuing round of pit stops.

Racing restarted on lap 67. Ryan Blaney assumed the lead on lap 68 and led 26 laps until Paul Menard took the lead from Blaney on lap 94 and led one lap, but debris on the back straightaway brought out the fourth caution of the race on lap 94, from William Byron's car, and Martin Truex Jr. chose not to pit and he took the lead a lap later.

Racing resumed on lap 97. The fifth caution of the race came out for a seven-car wreck in turn 3 another (The Big One) involving Chase Elliott, Danica Patrick, Kevin Harvick, David Ragan, Martin Truex Jr., Brad Keselowski, and Kasey Kahne. A total of eleven cars were out of the race.

Restart occurred on Lap 109 for a 12-lap shootout to the end of the second stage, which Ryan Blaney won, claiming the ten championship and one playoff point after crossing the line to complete Lap 120.

Final stage 
Back to the green flag with 73 to go, Denny Hamlin took the lead with 28 to go and led 3 laps, and Ryan Blaney assumed the lead with 26 to go and led 26 laps. The caution flew for the seventh time with 9 to go for a single-car spin as William Byron spun out into turn 2, so that meant Joey Logano won the free pass under caution.

Racing resumed with 6 to go and a major multi-car wreck (a third "The Big One") brought out the eighth caution of the race. 2017 Daytona 500 winner Kurt Busch tried to pass Denny Hamlin but contact behind him triggered the melee. A total of twelve cars were involved including Kurt Busch, Martin Truex Jr., Matt DiBenedetto, Ricky Stenhouse Jr., Ryan Blaney, Alex Bowman, Ryan Newman, Joey Logano, Bubba Wallace, Jeffrey Earnhardt, Brendan Gaughan, and A. J. Allmendinger. The multi-car wreck sent the race into overtime.

Overtime 

The race resumed on lap 205 of 200 advertised, for a 2-lap NASCAR Overtime. Aric Almirola was leading at the white flag, but a mistimed block on the super stretch forced Austin Dillon to drive into his right-rear corner and turn Almirola into the wall. Dillon drove on and scored his second career NASCAR Monster Energy Cup Series victory along with Dillon’s first career Daytona 500 victory, 20 years after Dale Earnhardt won the 1998 Daytona 500 in the same seat.  After the September 2017 closure of the deal between Dillon's sponsor Dow Chemical to acquire E. I. DuPont and Nemours (which had been a NASCAR sponsor from 1992 to 2012), this win was the first for the merged DowDuPont, bringing together two major race-winning sponsors.

Post race

"I did what I had to do in the end; I hate it for the 10 Guys" said Dillon, after a series of burnouts. This was in reference to contact between the two on the final lap.

Race results

Stage Results
Stage One
Laps: 60

Stage Two
Laps: 60

Final Stage Results

Stage Three
Laps: 80

Racing statistics
 24 lead changes among 14 drivers
 8 cautions for 37 laps
 Time of race: 3 hours, 26 minutes and 58 seconds
 Average speed: 
 Margin of victory: 0.260 seconds

Media

Television

Since 2001—with the exception of 2002, 2004 and 2006—the Daytona 500 has been carried by Fox in the United States. The booth crew consisted of longtime NASCAR lap-by-lap announcer Mike Joy, three–time Daytona 500 champion Jeff Gordon, and 1989 race winner Darrell Waltrip. Pit road was manned by Jamie Little, Regan Smith, Vince Welch and Matt Yocum.

Radio
The race was broadcast on radio by the Motor Racing Network—who has covered the Daytona 500 since 1970—and simulcast on Sirius XM NASCAR Radio. The booth crew consisted of longtime announcer Joe Moore, Jeff Striegle and 1989 Cup Series champion Rusty Wallace. Longtime turn announcer – and prodigy of MRN co-founder Ken Squier – Dave Moody was the lead turn announcer. He called the Daytona 500 from atop the Sunoco tower outside the exit of turn 2 when the field was racing through turns 1 and 2. Mike Bagley worked the backstretch for the Daytona 500 from a spotter's stand on the inside of the track. Kyle Rickey called the Daytona 500 when the field was racing through turns 3 and 4 from the Sunoco tower outside the exit of turn 4. On pit road, MRN was manned by lead pit reporter and NASCAR Hall of Fame Executive Director Winston Kelley. He was joined on pit road by Steve Post, Kim Coon and Alex Hayden.

Standings after the race

Drivers' Championship standings

Manufacturers' Championship standings

Note: Only the first 16 positions are included for the driver standings.

Notes

References

2018 Monster Energy NASCAR Cup Series
2018 in sports in Florida
February 2018 sports events in the United States
NASCAR races at Daytona International Speedway